The siege of Issa took place from 230 BC to 229 BC between the forces of the Ancient Greek colony of Issa, aided by the Roman Republic, and the Ardiaean Kingdom of Illyria.

Prelude

Earlier in 230 BC, Illyrian forces under Queen Teuta and Scerdilaidas had invaded Epirus through both land and by sea, capturing Phoenice and much of Epirus, passing Antigoneia and nearing Helicranum (modern Ioannina). Despite an Illyrian victory at the Battle of Phoenice, a pro-Dardanian rebellion in the north-east of the Kingdom forced Teuta to call back Illyrian forces from Epirus. Teuta quickly crushed the rebellion, and now turned towards Issa, situated off the coastline of Illyria.

Siege

Shortly after defeating the rebels, Illyrians under Teuta and Demetrius, commander of neighbouring Pharos island, begun to siege Issa. Soon after the siege begun, Rome sent ambassadors to meet Teuta at Issa. Teuta ordered the killing of one of the ambassadors who had offended her. Following this, Rome declared war, starting the First Illyrian War in 230 BC, and invaded Illyrian occupied Corcyra. The commander of the Illyrian garrison in Corcyra was Demetrius, who surrendered his forces, along with control of Corcyra and Pharos, to the Romans and betrayed Teuta. The Romans then landed at southern Illyria with the guidance of Demetrius, and after much success, they sailed north to relieve the siege of Issa in 229 BC. The Romans defeated the Illyrian besiegers and relieved the Issaeans, with the island coming under Roman protection. The Illyrian besiegers acting under Demetrius were spared by the Romans, whilst those under Teuta retreated to Arbo.

Cause of the war

Polybius says that the Romans had sent ambassadors to Illyria due to the killings of Romans and numerous attacks on Roman vessels by the Illyrians. Appian, on the other hand, says that Romans intervened after Issa requested Roman support. A later historian, Gruen, states that Appian (who reported the siege almost four centuries after Polybius) and later historians misinterpreted Roman intervention, saying it was just a coincidence that the Illyrians were besieging Issa, and that Roman intervention just to liberate Issa was an inadequate excuse for war (though it is possible that Issa did indeed request Roman assistance). As well as this, after the Romans begun the First Illyrian War in 230 BC, they first captured many other territories, leaving Issa to be besieged for over a year, before finally liberating the island towards the end of the campaign.

Notes

References

230 BC
229 BC
Issa
History of the Adriatic Sea
Issa 230
Issa
Issa